Scott Thomas Leius (born September 24, 1965) is a former American League baseball player who played during the 1990s.

Leius was drafted by the Minnesota Twins in the 13th round of the 1986 Major League Baseball Draft out of Concordia College in New York. He then played in the minor leagues for the next four seasons. He was a late season call up by the Minnesota Twins and debuted with the parent club on September 3, 1990. Leius would remain with the Minnesota Twins through the 1995 season when he left for the Minnesota Twins' American League rival, the Cleveland Indians where he spent just one season, 1996. Leius was out of Major League Baseball for the 1997 season. Leius played for the Kansas City Royals during the 1998 and 1999 seasons, ending his career on July 3, 1999.

It was with Minnesota that Leius was part of their 1991 World Series season, during that series Leius is best known for hitting a game-winning home run off Tom Glavine breaking up a 2-2 tie in the 8th inning of Game 2. A steady defender at third base, he finished second to Wade Boggs in Gold Glove balloting in 1994. His highest yearly salary was paid out in 1995 while Leius was with the Minnesota Twins and amounted to $760,000 USD. This payout for Leius was a result his 1994 season in which he posted career highs in runs (57), home runs (14), RBIs (49) and tied his career high in slugging percentage (.417).

References

External links

Scott Leius at Baseball Almanac

1965 births
Living people
Kansas City Royals players
Minnesota Twins players
Cleveland Indians players
Major League Baseball third basemen
Baseball players from New York (state)
Nashville Sounds players
Elizabethton Twins players
Orlando Twins players
Portland Beavers players
Omaha Royals players
Visalia Oaks players
Kenosha Twins players
Concordia Clippers baseball players
Buffalo Bisons (minor league) players
Mamaroneck High School alumni